Nurettin "Nuri" Boytorun (28 March 1908 – 28 November 1988) was a Turkish Olympian sport wrestler, trainer and technical director. He competed in the Middleweight division of Greco-Roman category at the 1928 and 1936 Summer Olympics.

He was born in Istanbul, Ottoman Empire. He was the Balkan champion four times in a row. Nuri Boytorun was Turkey's flag bearer at the 1936 Summer Olympics.

After retiring from active sports, he served as the trainer of the Turkish national team. Nuri Boytorun instructed wrestlers such as Yaşar Doğu, Celal Atik, Gazanfer Bilge and Ahmet Kireççi, among others. He was technical director of the national team, which participated at the Olympics in 1948, 1952 and 1956.

Accepting an offer, he emigrated to Italy, and served as the technical director of the Italian national Greco-Roman wrestling team.

Boytorun died on November 28, 1988. He was succeeded by his wife Süheyla and two sons Haluk and Hamdi.

References

External links
 

1908 births
1988 deaths
Turkish male sport wrestlers
Olympic wrestlers of Turkey
Wrestlers at the 1928 Summer Olympics
Wrestlers at the 1936 Summer Olympics
Sportspeople from Istanbul
20th-century Turkish people